Big City Children  is a 1929 German silent film directed by Arthur Haase and starring Grete Reinwald, Gustl Gstettenbaur and Carl Auen.

The film's sets were designed by Robert A. Dietrich.

Cast

References

Bibliography
 Gerhard Lamprecht. Deutsche Stummfilme: 1927–1931.

External links

1929 films
Films of the Weimar Republic
German silent feature films
Films set in Berlin
German black-and-white films
Social realism in film